Andrei Neguța (born 18 July 1952 in Hîrbovăț) is a Moldovan politician and diplomat, former Ambassador of Moldova to Russia (2009-2012). Currently he serves as Member of Parliament of Moldova (since 2014).

References

External links
Andrei Neguța profile on parlament.md
 APCE - Andrei Neguța

1952 births
Living people
Ambassadors of Moldova to Russia
People from Anenii Noi District
Moldovan MPs 2014–2018
Party of Communists of the Republic of Moldova politicians